Richard Jarůšek (born August 8, 1991) is a Czech professional ice hockey player. He is currently playing for HK Hradec Kralove of the Czech Extraliga.

Jarůšek made his Czech Extraliga debut playing with BK Mladá Boleslav during the 2014-15 Czech Extraliga season. Jarůšek competed for Czech Republic at the 2016 IIHF World Championship.

References

External links

1991 births
Living people
Czech ice hockey forwards
BK Mladá Boleslav players
Stadion Hradec Králové players
Orli Znojmo players
Saginaw Spirit players
Ice hockey people from Brno
HC Litvínov players
HC Sparta Praha players
Czech expatriate ice hockey players in Canada
Czech expatriate sportspeople in Austria
Expatriate ice hockey players in Austria